Prior Lake High School (PLHS) is located in Savage, Minnesota, United States and enrolls students in grades 912. The school is part of the South Suburban Conference. It has approximately 2,900 students currently enrolled, along with a teaching and administrative staff of around 400. The students and teams at Prior Lake High School are known as "Lakers". A book, "Another Planet: A Year in the Life of a Suburban High School", was written by author Elinor Burkett and paints a controversial portrait of life in the school and around the city of Prior Lake. In 2003 when the new high school building opened in Savage, the decision was made to keep the name "Prior Lake" High School because of the rich history of the school. The principal's name is John Bezek. The school currently utilizes a 6-period system.

Growth
In 2009 the school faced issues with overcrowding, with about 200 extra students over capacity enrolled in the high school. A Growth Task Force was created to find solutions to the issue, which included closing open enrollment. During the 2013–14 school year, PLHS enrolled 405 students over capacity. To address short-term spatial issues, a 4th wing of PLHS was opened for the 2014–15 school year to combat overcrowding. Just one year later during the 2015–16 school year, however, PLHS saw enrollment numbers above 100% capacity again. In 2017, Prior Lake-Savage Area Schools passed a referendum that allocated $46.8 million for construction on Prior Lake High School to combat growing enrollment. Some new classrooms will be ready halfway through the 2019–20 school year, but as of 2018-19 the schools is operating at 115% of its enrollment capacity.

Construction
Prior Lake High School was originally designed by Wold Architects and Engineers in 2003. Wold continued to be involved in the later additions to the school, with the assistance of Nexus Solutions. The 2018 referendum renovations included the expansion of Towers A-C, a cafeteria expansion, a new north entry, new weight and locker rooms, updated toilets and showers, a café, a new classroom wing with flexible learning spaces, and an expanded auto shop.  The construction was carried out by H+U Construction, and was completed in July 2020.

Awards and honors
Prior Lake High School was ranking 197 out of 500 in Newsweek's best high schools in the country in 2016.

Notable alumni
Teal Bunbury
Kylie Bunbury
Drew Christensen
Becca Kufrin
Eric Pratt
A. J. Sass

References

External links

Public high schools in Minnesota
Schools in Scott County, Minnesota
1968 establishments in Minnesota
Educational institutions established in 1968